The Roman Catholic Diocese of Sandhurst is a suffragan Latin Rite diocese of the Archdiocese of Melbourne, erected in 1874, covering the central and north-east regions of Victoria, Australia, including Bendigo.

Sacred Heart Cathedral in Bendigo is the seat of the Bishop of Sandhurst. On 3 February 2012, the Vatican announced the appointment of Les Tomlinson as the seventh Bishop of Sandhurst. He was installed in a liturgical ceremony on 1 March 2012.

On 23 July 2019, Fr Shane Mackinlay was announced as the next Bishop of Sandhurst.

History
The Diocese of Sandhurst was established on 30 March 1874, from the Diocese of Melbourne. When the Diocese of Melbourne was made an archdiocese, the Diocese of Sandhurst became one of its suffragans. Both dioceses are within the Ecclesiastical Province of Melbourne.

By 1911, the diocese had Augustinian Fathers, Marist Brothers, Sisters of Mercy, Sisters of St. Brigid, Sisters of St. Joseph, Presentation Sisters, Faithful Companions of Jesus and Good Shepherd Sisters.

Construction of the Sacred Heart Cathedral began in 1885 under Bishop Crane. Its organ was installed in 1905, under Stephen Reville. The cathedral was completed in 1977 under Bernard Stewart. Sacred Heart Cathedral is one of the largest Neo-Gothic or Gothic Revival cathedrals in Australia and its construction was largely made possible by the estate of the Paderborn-born German pioneer priest Henry Backhaus, the first Roman Catholic priest on the goldfields of Bendigo.

Ordinaries
The following individuals have been appointed as Roman Catholic Bishops of Sandhurst:
{| class="wikitable"
!Order
!Name
!Date enthroned
!Reign ended
!Term of office
!Reason for term end
|-
|align="center"| ||Martin Crane, OSA † ||align="center" |4 August 1874 ||align="center" |21 October 1901 ||align="right"| ||Died in office
|-
|align="center"| ||Stephen Reville OSA † ||align="center" |21 October 1901 ||align="center" |18 September 1916 ||align="right"| ||Died in office
|-
|align="center"| ||John McCarthy † ||align="center" |14 February 1917 ||align="center" |18 August 1950 ||align="right"| ||Died in office
|-
|align="center"| ||Bernard Denis Stewart † ||align="center" |18 August 1950 ||align="center" |21 April 1979 ||align="right"| ||Retired and appointed Bishop Emeritus of Sandhurst
|-
|align="center"| ||Noel Desmond Daly † ||align="center" |21 April 1979 ||align="center" |1 July 2000 ||align="right"| ||Resigned and appointed Bishop Emeritus of Sandhurst
|-
|align="center"| ||Joseph Grech † ||align="center" |8 March 2001 ||align="center" |28 December 2010 ||align="right"| ||Died in office
|-
|align="center"| ||Les Tomlinson ||align="center" |1 March 2012 ||align="center" |23 July 2019 ||align="right"|7 years, 142 days ||Retired and appointed Bishop Emeritus of Sandhurst
|-
|align="center"| ||Shane Mackinlay||align="center" |16 October 2019 ||align="center"| current ||align="right"|  ||
|-
|}

Following the death in office of Joseph Grech, Monsignor Frank Marriott, the administrator of Sacred Heart Cathedral, was appointed to serve as administrator of the diocese. On 3 February 2012, Monsignor Marriott announced that Pope Benedict XVI had appointed Les Tomlinson as the next bishop. Tomlinson's installation took place on 1 March 2012.

Coadjutor bishops
Stephen Reville, O.E.S.A. † (1885–1901)
Bernard Denis Stewart † (1946–1950)

Priests of the diocese who became bishops
Hugh Edward Ryan † - appointed Bishop of Townsville in 1938
Thomas Vincent Cahill † - appointed Bishop of Cairns in 1948
Francis Xavier Thomas † - appointed Bishop of Geraldton in 1962
Francis Peter de Campo † - appointed Coadjutor Bishop of Port Pirie in 1979

Other information
The diocese comprises the area north of the Great Dividing Range, south of the Murray River and east of the Loddon River, an area of 45,178 km2 (17,450 sq mls).  The diocese is divided into 41 parishes and has 74 priests, 109 religious sisters and 5 brothers.  The diocese had a Catholic population of about 86,000 in 2006.

There are 50 Catholic schools in the diocese – 40 primary, nine secondary and one P–10 school – catering for 7,700 primary and 5,850 secondary students. Bendigo's oldest Catholic church is St Kilian's.

Saint Augustine's Church, Myers Flat, is the oldest Roman Catholic church building in the Diocese of Sandhurst.  The church was built by John O'Brien and consecrated by Monsignor Hayes in 1864.

See also

 Roman Catholicism in Australia
 Anglican Diocese of Bendigo

References

Further reading

External links

 Official website
 Catholic Diocese of Sandhurst website

 
Sandhurst
Sandhurst
Sandhurst
Sandhurst, Roman Catholic Diocese of
1874 establishments in Australia